Viktor Andreyevich Simov (Russian: Виктор Андреевич Симов, 14 April 1858, Moscow - 21 August 1935, Moscow) was a Russian painter and scenographer.

Biography 
He graduated from the Moscow School of Painting, Sculpture and Architecture in 1882. From 1885 to 1886, he worked as a decorator for Savva Mamontov, at his Private Opera. He also created some paintings and lithographs.

In 1898, he decided to devote his career to working with the newly founded Moscow Art Theatre, where he would create designs for fifty-one performances and earn the admiration of the iconic actor, Konstantin Stanislavski. Simov not only created a new aesthetic for set design, he was also involved with ideological interpretations of the material, and the directing process. Together with Stanislavski, he began the practice of doing field research.

He expanded his activities in 1909, by designing a dacha in collaboration with the architect, Leonid Vesnin.

In 1924, he designed sets depicting Mars, for the groundbreaking science-fiction film, Aelita, by Yakov Protazanov. The following year, he also served as an artist, under the direction of Ivan Stepanov, for The Stationmaster, a dramatic film based on a story by Alexander Pushkin. Later that same year, he returned to the Art Theatre, where he would stay until his death in 1935, aged seventy-seven.

References

Further reading 
  Paul Fryer and Anastasia Toros (Eds.) Viktor Simov: Stanislavsky’s Designer, Routledge, 2019 
 Y. I. Nekhoroshev: Декоратор Художественного театра Виктор Андреевич Симов (full text) Советский художник, 1984, 208 pages

External links

 Aelita: Queen of Mars (complete film) @ YouTube

1858 births
1935 deaths
Russian scenic designers
19th-century painters from the Russian Empire
Russian male painters
20th-century Russian painters
19th-century male artists from the Russian Empire
20th-century Russian male artists
Moscow School of Painting, Sculpture and Architecture alumni